Merriwa is a town located in the Upper Hunter Shire, in the far west of the Hunter region of New South Wales, Australia.

At the 2011 census, Merriwa had a population of 1,790 people. Up until 2004, Merriwa was part of the Merriwa Shire local government area, when it was merged with nearby Scone Shire and Murrurundi Shire councils to form the Upper Hunter Council.

The 1940 Melbourne Cup winner, Old Rowley, retired to Merriwa.

Events
Every year, Merriwa hosts a range of events including; 
 Merriwa Morgans Cup Races - Held Annually in April 
 The Festival of the Fleeces - Queens Birthday June Long Weekend Annually
 Merriwa Springtime Show - 3rd weekend of September annually

March 2020 marked the first of what is set to be an annual event - The "Le Tour de Merriwa" - an 84 km ride along the newly finished and quite, rural Coulson's Creek Road towards Willow Tree with what will become an iconic climb up to the Gap!

Heritage listings
Merriwa has a number of heritage-listed sites, including:
 Bow Street: Colonial Cottage Museum (1857)
Merriwa railway line
Merriwa Courthouse (1958)
Fitzroy Hotel Merriwa (1914)
The Royal Hotel Merriwa (1914)
Holy Trinity Church (1875-99)
The Catholic Church (1881)

Climate

Schools
 Merriwa Central School (Multi-campus)
 St Joseph's Private School

Notable people
 Catherine Cecily O'Brien, Dominican sister and educationist

See also

 Merriwa railway line
 Merriwa Community Portal

References

External links

Suburbs of Upper Hunter Shire
Towns in the Hunter Region